Seminoleconus is a synonym of Conus (Stephanoconus) Mörch, 1852 represented as Conus Linnaeus, 1758.

These are sea snails, marine gastropod mollusks in the family Conidae, the cone snails and their allies.

Species which at one point were listed in the genus Seminoleconus have been placed in the genus Tenorioconus, including Seminoleconus cedonulli (Linnaeus, 1767), Seminoleconus mappa (Lightfoot, 1786), Seminoleconus aurantius (Hwass, 1792), Seminoleconus curassaviensis (Hwass, 1792),  Seminoleconus archon (Broderip, 1833),  Seminoleconus scopulorum Van Mol, Tursch & Kempf, 1971, Seminoleconus pseudaurantius Vink & Cosel, 1985, Seminoleconus harlandi Petuch, 1987, Seminoleconus duffyi Petuch, 1992, and Seminoleconus julieandreae Cargile, 1995.  All these have become synonyms.

Several species of fossil cone shells have been named in the genus, including Seminoleconus violetae Petuch 1988, Seminoleconus trippae Petuch 1991, and Seminoleconus diegelae Petuch 1994.

References

External links
 To World Register of Marine Species

Conidae